Mucha, more commonly known as Muzha, is a short form of Pratimokṣa in Chinese and also a given name.

Muzha as a Historical Figure

As Master Sangha was seen as an avatar of Avalokiteśvara (Kuan Yin), Mucha was later fictionalized as Kuan Yin's apprentice in the Zajü  Journey to the West during the Great Yuan period. Afterwards, he was further blend with Hui-an as "Mucha Hui-an" in the Chinese classic novel Journey to the West during the Great Ming period.

Footnotes

References

Tang dynasty Buddhist monks
Investiture of the Gods characters
Journey to the West characters